Sándor Szalay may refer to:

 Sándor Szalay (physicist) (1909–1987), Hungarian nuclear physics pioneer
 Sándor Szalay (figure skater) (1893–1965), Hungarian pair skater